Ahu Dasht (also Romanized as Āhū Dasht) is a village in Kolijan Rostaq-e Olya Rural District, Kolijan Rostaq District, Sari County, Mazandaran Province, Iran. At the 2006 census, its population was 197, in 65 families.

References 

Populated places in Sari County